Joachim Eickmayer (born 11 January 1993) is a French professional footballer who plays as a midfielder for Bourg-en-Bresse.

Career
Eickmayer played 10 matches in Ligue 1 for Sochaux, making his full debut on 10 August 2013 against Évian Thonon Gaillard.

On 21 June 2021, he signed with Bourg-en-Bresse.

Career statistics

References

External links
 Joachim Eickmayer at foot-national.com
 
 

1993 births
Living people
People from Bully-les-Mines
Sportspeople from Pas-de-Calais
French footballers
Association football midfielders
FC Sochaux-Montbéliard players
Arras FA players
Amiens SC players
Les Herbiers VF players
FC Chambly Oise players
Football Bourg-en-Bresse Péronnas 01 players
Ligue 1 players
Championnat National players
Footballers from Hauts-de-France